Dániel Lettrich (born 21 April 1983) is a Hungarian midfielder currently playing for Újbuda TC. He has previously played for Újpest FC and Dunakanyar-Vác FC. He has not made an appearance for Újbuda TC's first team yet.

External links
 Players of Újpest SC
 

1983 births
Living people
Hungarian footballers
Újpest FC players
Vác FC players
Association football midfielders